A by-election was held in the state electoral district of North Shore on 8 April 2017. The by-election was triggered by the resignation of Jillian Skinner after a cabinet reshuffle. It was held on the same day as the Gosford and Manly state by-elections.

Dates

Candidates
The candidates in ballot paper order are as follows:

Results

Jillian Skinner resigned.

See also
Electoral results for the district of North Shore
List of New South Wales state by-elections

References

2017 elections in Australia
New South Wales state by-elections